The following is a summary of the 2013–14 season of competitive football in Switzerland.

Men's national team
The home team is on the left column; the away team is on the right column.

2014 World Cup qualification

2014 FIFA World Cup

Friendly matches

Non-official matches
Game duration 45 min

Women's national team
The home team is on the left column; the away team is on the right column.

World Cup 2015 qualifying

Friendly matches

2014 Cyprus Cup

League standings

Raiffeisen Super League

Brack.ch Challenge League

 
Seasons in Swiss football
2012 in Swiss sport
2013 in Swiss sport